Satyajeet Bachhav (born 28 November 1992) is an Indian cricketer. his caste is mali. He made his Twenty20 debut for Maharashtra in the 2015–16 Syed Mushtaq Ali Trophy on 3 January 2016. He made his List A debut for Maharashtra in the 2016–17 Vijay Hazare Trophy on 4 March 2017.

He was the joint-leading wicket-taker for Maharashtra in the 2018–19 Vijay Hazare Trophy, with fifteen dismissals in eight matches. He was also the leading wicket-taker for Maharashtra in the 2018–19 Ranji Trophy, with 28 dismissals in seven matches. He finished the 2018–19 Syed Mushtaq Ali Trophy as the leading wicket-taker in the tournament, with twenty dismissals in twelve matches.

References

External links
 

1992 births
Living people
Indian cricketers
Maharashtra cricketers
People from Nashik